Dennis Morris may refer to:

 Dennis Morris (photographer), British photographer
 Dennis Morris (American football) (born 1987), American football tight end